BBCF or variation, may refer to:

 BlazBlue: Central Fiction, a 2016 videogame
 BBC First, a television brand, operating internationally, and localized in several countries
 Bangladesh Baptist Church Fellowship, for Bengali Christians
 믏 (U+BBCF), a Hangul character; see List of modern Hangul characters in ISO/IEC 2022–compliant national character set standards